Dana Air is a Nigerian airline headquartered in Ikeja and based out of Lagos's Murtala Muhammed International Airport.

History 
Due to technical deficiencies in the aircraft used, the Nigerian Aviation Safety Authority (NCAA) again grounded Dana Air until further notice in January 2014. However, the airline was reinstated in December 2014.

In May 2021, Dana Air teamed-up with Ibom Air to launch the first-ever domestic airline codeshare agreement by Nigerian airlines.

On July 20, 2022, the airline had both its license and certificate suspended by the Nigerian authorities after it was deemed financially unfit to maintain operations. The airline claimed that the increase in the cost of jet fuel, unavailability of foreign exchange, and inflation were contributory factors. 

However, after being reinstated by the Nigerian Aviation Safety Authority (NCAA) following the airline's success with NCAA audits, the airline resumed operations in November 2022.

Destinations
As of February 2021, Dana Air serves the following destinations:

Nigeria
Abuja – Nnamdi Azikiwe International Airport
Enugu – Enugu Airport
Lagos – Murtala Muhammed International Airport base
Owerri – Sam Mbakwe Airport
Port Harcourt – Port Harcourt International Airport
Uyo – Akwa Ibom Airport

Fleet

As of July 2022, prior to the suspension of operations, the Dana Air fleet consisted of the following aircraft:

Incidents and accidents
 On 3 June 2012, a Dana Air McDonnell Douglas MD-83 operating as Flight 0992 crashed into a two-story building at Iju Railway, Ishaga, a suburb of Lagos. All 153 people on the aircraft were killed. Following the crash, all flights by Dana Air were halted by Nigeria's Civil Aviation Authority (NCAA).
 On 7 February 2018, a Dana Air flight landed in Abuja and was taxiing on the runway when one of the emergency exit doors fell off. No casualties resulted from the incident. Passengers claimed that the door rattled throughout the flight. A spokesperson for the airline, however claimed that the door could not have fallen off without a conscious effort by a passenger. The Nigerian Civil Aviation Authority instituted an investigation into the incident to determine what exactly happened.
 On 20 February 2018, a Dana Air MD-83 with registration 5N-SRI veered off the runway at Port-Harcourt international airport during a night landing. There were no casualties, but the aircraft suffered significant damage. Both the airline and the Federal Airports Authority of Nigeria stated that the cause of the accident was inclement weather as there was torrential rain at the time of the landing.

References

External links

Official website

Airlines of Nigeria
Economy of Lagos State
Organizations based in Lagos State